Goswin Haex von Loenhout, O. Carm. or Goswinus Hexius (1398 – 31 Mar 1475) was a Roman Catholic prelate who served as Auxiliary Bishop of Utrecht (1469–1475).

Biography
Goswin Haex was born Loenhout. It is likely that he is the same as "Goeswin van Nedervenne" (Nedervenne was a settlement in Loenhout), who in 1412 became a citizen of Bergen op Zoom. He was ordained a Carmelite priest in Vlissingen. On 15 May 1469, he was appointed during the papacy of Pope Paul II as Auxiliary Bishop of Utrecht and either Titular Bishop of Hierapolis in Phrygia or Hierapolis in Syria. On 29 Sep 1469, he was consecrated bishop by Guillaume Fillastre, Bishop of Tournai. He served as Auxiliary Bishop of Utrecht until his death on 31 Mar 1475.

References 

1398 births
1475 deaths
15th-century Roman Catholic bishops in the Holy Roman Empire
Bishops appointed by Pope Paul II
Carmelite bishops
People from Wuustwezel
Bishops of Utrecht